Common knotweed is  a common name for several plants and may refer to:

Polygonum arenastrum
Polygonum plebeium, native to South Asia